Ballymoney Borough Council was the local authority of Ballymoney in Northern Ireland. Originally formed in the 1970s, the council ceased to operate as a separate entity in 2015 when it was combined with other local authorities to form the Causeway Coast and Glens District Council.

History
The borders of the Ballymoney local authority area were established in 1973, following the enactment of the Local Government (Boundaries) Act (Northern Ireland) 1971. Originally known as Ballymoney District Council, the local authority became Ballymoney Borough Council following the grant of a charter of incorporation in 1977. In May 2015, the council ceased to operate as a separate entity when, under a reorganisation of local government in Northern Ireland, it was merged with Coleraine Borough Council, Limavady Borough Council and Moyle District Council, to become Causeway Coast and Glens District Council.

Population
The area covered by Ballymoney Borough Council had a population of 31,224 residents according to the 2011 Northern Ireland census.

See also
 1973 Ballymoney District Council election
 1977 Ballymoney Borough Council election

References

External links
Ballymoney Borough Council website (archived 2007)

District councils of Northern Ireland, 1973–2015
Borough Council